Fabián Panisello (born 11 October 1963) is an Argentinian-Spanish composer, conductor, and professor.

Professional life 
Panisello was born in Buenos Aires, Argentina. He studied composition in Buenos Aires with Francisco Kröpfl and at the Mozarteum of Salzburg with Bogusław Schaeffer (Magister Atrium, 1993, Diploma of Excellence and Special Prize of the Ministry of Culture of Austria). He completed his musical studies with composers such as Elliott Carter, Franco Donatoni, Brian Ferneyhough, and Luis de Pablo, as well as with conductors such as Peter Eötvös and Jorma Panula.

Panisello receives commissions from important orchestras and festivals throughout the world. He has collaborated with Pierre Boulez, Luciano Berio, Karlheinz Stockhausen, Susanna Mälkki, and Peter Eötvös and has worked with orchestras and ensembles including SWR Symphonieorchester, WDR Symphony Orchestra Cologne, Deutsches Symphonie-Orchester Berlin, Mozarteum Orchestra Salzburg, BBC Symphony Orchestra, Orchestra of the Opéra de Lyon, Ensemble Modern, Nouvel Ensemble Moderne, Israeli Contemporary Players, and Meitar Ensemble.

He is the founding director of PluralEnsemble in Spain. He is Professor of Composition at the Reina Sofía School of Music in Madrid and guest professor at the China Conservatory of Music in Beijing. From 1996 to 2000, he was Professor of Musical Analysis and then Academic Director at the Reina Sofía School of Music and from 1996 to 2013 at the International Institute of Chamber Music of Madrid, and has been Director of the same institutions from 2014 to 2019. He is a member of the National Academy of Fine Arts of Argentina, the Academic Committee of Fundación Albéniz, and the Consulting Council of the Teatro Real in Madrid.

Pedagogical work 
He has been invited to lecture at the Tokyo University of the Arts (Geidai), Manhattan School of Music, Jerusalem Academy of Music and Dance, University of California at Davis, University of Zaragoza, and the Institute of Music of the Pontifical Catholic University of Chile, as well as the universities of Graz and Tel Aviv, giving masterclasses and seminars on composition, conducting, and musical analysis.

Prizes 
Panisello's prizes include the following: 
 Premio de Fondo Nacional de las Artes (1988, Buenos Aires)
 Mozarts Erben Prize (1991, Salzburg)
 Würdigungspreis (Recognition Award) of the Ministry of Education, Science and Culture of Austria (1993, Vienna) 
 Editar Competition (1995, Buenos Aires)
 Premio Iberoamericano Rodolfo Halffter de Composición, First Prize (2004, Mexico)

Published works (selection)

Works for orchestra without soloist 
 Aksaks (October 2008, Donaueschingen)
 Mandala (October 2009, Madrid)
 Cuadernos (22 July 2004, Madrid)

Works for orchestra with soloist 
 Movements for piano and orchestra (May 2010, Madrid)
 Trumpet Concerto (Concierto para Trompeta y Orquesta) (January 2010, Berlín)
 Violin Concerto (Concierto per Violino) (February 2004, Madrid)

Opera 
 Le Malentendu, chamber opera after the work of the same name by Albert Camus with libretto by Juan Lucas (première March 2016, Teatro Colón, Buenos Aires)
 Les Rois mages, multimedia musical theatre based on the book by Michael Tournier and a libretto by Gilles Rico (première January 2019, National Auditorium of Music, Madrid)

Works for ensembles of more than five instruments 
 Solstice (2013, Madrid and Frankfurt)
 Chamber Concerto (Concierto de cámara) (May 2005, Lyon)
 Moods II (2001, Alicante)

Works for voice  
 L'Officina della Resurrezione (2013, Tel Aviv) for baritone, electronics and string quartet 
 L'Officina della Resurrezione, Version II (2014, Katowice) for baritone, spoken chorus, electronics and string orchestra 
 Gothic Songs (2012, Alte Oper Frankfurt)
 Libro del frío (September 2011, Schwaz, Austria) for soprano, flute, clarinet, violin, viola, violoncello, and piano

Works for homogeneous formations 
 Three Movements for String Quartet (2006, Takefu, Japan) 
 Cinco piezas métricas (2000)
 Trio II (1996)
 Klavieretüden Band I (2008)
 Klavieretüden Band II (2015)

References

External links 
 Official website
 PluralEnsemble website 
 Reina Sofía School of Music professor page
 Karsten Witt Musik Management artist page
 Edition Peters composer page
NEOS artist page

Argentine composers
1963 births
Living people
20th-century classical composers
20th-century conductors (music)
21st-century classical composers
21st-century conductors (music)
Argentine classical composers
Argentine classical musicians
Male opera composers
Male conductors (music)